The 1986 season was the Cincinnati Bengals' 17th season in the National Football League (NFL), their 19th overall, and their third under head coach Sam Wyche.  The Bengals were one of two teams with ten wins that failed to make the AFC playoffs in 1986.

Third-year quarterback Boomer Esiason, who had the best season of his career, passed for a team-record 3,959 yards, 24 touchdowns and 17 interceptions with a completion percentage of 58.2 and a passer rating of 87.7, while halfback James Brooks rushed for 1,087 yards as the Bengals went 10-6, narrowly missing a playoff berth. Linebacker Reggie Williams was selected NFL Man of the Year for his efforts to charity and the community. The Bengals amassed a club-record 621 yards net offense in a 52–21 victory over the New York Jets on December 21. No NFL team has since matched that total in a regulation-time game since.

Offseason

NFL draft

Roster

Regular season

Schedule

Standings

Team leaders

Passing

Rushing

Receiving

Defensive

Kicking and punting

Special teams

Awards and records 
 Boomer Esiason, franchise record (since broken), most passing yards in one game, 425 yards (vs. New York Jets, on December 21, 1986) 
 Boomer Esiason, franchise record (since broken), most passing yards in one season, 3,959 yards 
 Boomer Esiason, franchise record, most touchdown passes in one game, 5 passes (achieved on December 21, 1986)

Milestones 
 James Brooks, 1000 yard rushing season (1,087) 
 Cris Collinsworth, 1000 yard receiving season (1,024)

References

External links 
 1986 Cincinnati Bengals at Pro-Football-Reference.com

Cincinnati Bengals
Cincinnati Bengals seasons
Cinc